Brightly is a rural locality in the Mackay Region, Queensland, Australia. In the  Brightly had a population of 70 people.

History 
Brightley State School opened on 23 February 1925 and closed on 9 December 1988. The spelling of the school name differs from the locality name. The school was at 1843 Mirani Eton Road and the school building is now used as a private residence.

In the  Brightly had a population of 70 people.

References 

Mackay Region
Localities in Queensland